In the Name of the Son is a 2007 drama/thriller short film, set during and after the Bosnian War in present-day Los Angeles, written and directed by Harun Mehmedinović and produced by Vikramadithya Singh.

History 
The 25-minute film took a year and a half to complete and premiered at Telluride Film Festival in September, 2007. The film is not autobiographical, but it addresses the breakdown of normal societal ties that people in Bosnia witnessed and that Mehmedinović said he could not have written about without experiencing.

Plot 
The Name of the Son is a film that looks at human conflicts in the present, brought about during personal clashes in the Bosnian War in 1994.

After escaping execution, Tarik, a Bosnian prisoner of war, immigrates to the United States looking to leave his past behind. The psychosis of the conflicts that war brought to him when coping with these in civilian life are very hard for him. Years later, the man who spared his life shows up on Tarik's doorstep asking for a favor. However, the two main protagonists' feelings of guilt and torment are brought to bear with near devastating consequences.

Cast 
 Sergej Trifunović as Tarik
 Jack Dimich as Pavle
 Elvedin Slipac as Milan
 Ingrid Walters as Ayanna
 Nino Cirabisi as Passenger
 Zoran Radanovich as Serb Officer #1
 Zoran Danilović as Serb Officer #2
 Val Marijan as Serb Officer #3
 Mark Simich as Serb Officer #4
 Edin Gali as Bosnian POW #1
 William Love as Bosnian POW #2
 Eric Reinholt as Bosnian POW #3
 Jessica Moreno as Passenger
 Ryan O'Quinn as World Cup Announcer #1
 Chip Mullaney as World Cup Announcer #2

Awards 

Winner of 30 International Awards including: 
 Best Director
 Franklin J. Schaffner Award, American Film Institute 
 Richard P. Rogers Award, American Film Institute
 Special Jury Award, WorldFest-Houston International Film Festival
 Best Short 
 San Diego Film Festival
 Stony Brook Film Festival
 BendFilm Festival
 Cleveland International Film Festival
 USA Film Festival
 Tallahassee Film Festival 
 Savannah Film Festival
 Other Awards
 Angelus Award for "Audience Impact"
 Bridges/Larson Foundation Award for Screenwriting

References

External links 
 
 

2007 films
2007 short films
Bosnian War films
American films based on plays
Films set in the 1990s
Indian short films
Yugoslav Wars in fiction
Films about Bosnian genocide
Films scored by Pinar Toprak